Phyllanthus latifolius is a species of plant in the family Phyllanthaceae. It is endemic to Jamaica.  It is threatened by habitat loss.

References

latifolius
Near threatened plants
Endemic flora of Jamaica
Taxonomy articles created by Polbot
Taxa named by Olof Swartz